The Christian Peace Conference was an international organization based in Prague and founded in 1958 by Josef Hromádka, a pastor who had spent the war years in the United States, moving back to Czechoslovakia when the war ended and Heinrich Vogel, an evangelical theologian. Hromádka was a member of the Bureau of the World Peace Council.  He was not a Marxist, but the Christian Peace Conference often endorsed positions taken by Eastern bloc governments. It has been alleged to have received $210,000 from Soviet sources.

See also
 List of anti-war organizations

References

Further reading
 

Christian advocacy groups
Organizations established in 1958
Peace organizations by country
Organizations based in Prague
Communist front organizations
1958 establishments in Czechoslovakia